The Ooz (stylised as The OOZ) is the third studio album by English singer-songwriter Archy Marshall, and his second album under the stage name King Krule. It was released on 13 October 2017 via True Panther Sounds and XL Recordings. The album incorporates elements of trip hop, R&B, punk rock, and jazz.

Background
"Czech One" was released in August 2017 as the first King Krule song in four years. Archy Marshall subsequently announced the release of The Ooz in September 2017, with its title and release date being first reported in The New York Times fall preview guide. The album is Marshall's first studio album as King Krule since 2013's 6 Feet Beneath the Moon.

Reception

At Metacritic, which assigns a normalised rating out of 100 to reviews from mainstream critics, The Ooz received an average score of 80, based on 21 reviews, indicating "generally positive reviews". In a review for AllMusic, Andy Kellman compared the album to its predecessor stating that "the songwriting is more refined and the sounds are more disparate, resulting in a sort of controlled chaos, a scuzzy mix of nervy neo-rockabilly projectiles, howling dirges, and noodling dive-lounge tunes." Pitchfork gave The Ooz their "Best New Music" designation, with Jayson Greene complimenting the diversity of musical styles used on the album, as well as the distinctive sounds and textures. He wrote that the album "is the richest and most immersive album the London singer-songwriter has made yet" and that it is "a masterpiece of jaundiced vision from one of the most compelling artists alive." Alexis Petridis of The Guardian was more ambivalent, acknowledging the diverse musical styles while also considering the album to be "frustrating" and "a difficult listen." Though he recommends the album, Petridis considers the album's length to be a detraction, writing, "But self-indulgence is also its biggest drawback...The Ooz lasts more than an hour and virtually every track is allowed to ramble on for longer than it needs to." It was nominated for the 2018 Mercury Prize.

Accolades

Year-end lists

Decade-end lists

Track listing

Notes
 "Midnight 01 (Deep Sea Diver)" contains a sample from "Temptation Sensation", written by Heinz Kiessling.

Personnel
Musicians

 King Krule – vocals, guitar, bass, drums, keys, vocoder
 Dilip Harris – triangle, percussion, vibraphone, synth, marimba
 James Wilson – bass, vocals 
 George Bass – drums
 Ignacio Salvadores – saxophone
 Jack Towell – guitar
 Andy Ramsay – drum programming, percussion
 Marc Pell – bongos, tambourine
 Nana Giobbi – piano
 Okay Kaya – additional vocals 
 Beatriz Ortiz Mendes – spoken word 
 Idris Vicuña – spoken word 
 Maya Coline – backing vocals 
 Ella Rimmer – backing vocals 
 Adam Marshall – spoken word , backing vocals 
 Maria Dmetriev – spoken word 

Production

 Dilip Harris – co-production, mixing, engineering
 Archy Marshall – co-production, engineering
 Andy Ramsay – engineering
 Senor El Funkelinos – engineering
 Connor Atanda – engineering
 Barry Grint – mastering

Charts

References

2017 albums
King Krule albums
True Panther Sounds albums
XL Recordings albums